SS Antinous may refer to one of two Type C2-S-E1 ships built by Gulf Shipbuilding for the United States Maritime Commission:

  (MC hull number 483), transferred to the United States Navy as  USS Baxter (APA-94); sold for commercial use in 1947; scrapped in 1968
  (MC hull number 1604), scrapped in 1970

Other ships named Antinous include -

, an American cargo ship torpedoed and sunk in 1942

Ship names